Huoqiu railway station is a railway station in Mudan District, Heze, Shandong, China. It is an intermediate station on the Beijing–Kowloon railway and the Xinxiang–Yanzhou railway.

History
The station opened in 1980. From 2012 to 2014, the railway station was rebuilt and platforms raised.

See also
Heze East railway station

References 

Railway stations in Shandong
Railway stations in China opened in 1980